Las Acacias may refer to:

 Las Acacias, Montevideo
 Las Acacias (Madrid)
 , a district of Málaga, Spain
 Las Acacias (film), a 2011 Argentine film

See also
 Acacia (disambiguation)